The Federal Foundation for the Reappraisal of the SED Dictatorship (alternatively translated as "(Federal) Foundation for the Study of Communist Dictatorship in East Germany") is a government-funded organisation established in 1998 by the German parliament.

Its mandate is to assess the history (1949–1990) of the socialist regime of the German Democratic Republic (GDR, commonly known as East Germany), and its impact on the now reunified Germany.

As its logo, the foundation uses the former East German flag minus its coat of arms. In the final months of the GDR, many East German citizens cut out the flag's emblem in this manner.

The foundation also initiated a project "Aufbruch 1989" in which 17 organisations cooperated, including the Rosa-Luxemburg-Stiftung which is affiliated with the SED successor party, Die Linke. This was rejected by Hubertus Knabe, and after it was made public, by a public letter signed by Bärbel Bohley, Werner Schulz, Lutz Rathenow, Ralph Giordano, Erich Loest and others, with support by Lea Rosh and Michael Wolffsohn.

References

External links 
  
 www.bundesstiftung-aufarbeitung.de 
 "Zwist unter den Stasi-Aufklärern", Berliner Morgenpost 

History of East Germany
Foundations based in Germany
Organisations based in Berlin
1998 establishments in Germany